The Rocky Mountain elk (Cervus canadensis nelsoni) is a subspecies of elk found in the Rocky Mountains and adjacent ranges of Western North America.

Habitat
The winter ranges are most common in open forests and floodplain marshes in the lower elevations. In the summer it migrates to the subalpine forests and alpine basins. Elk have a diverse habitat range that they can reside in but are most often found in forest and forest edge habitat and in mountain regions they often stay in higher elevations during warmer months and migrate down lower in the winter. They may even come down the mountain and leave the forest into some grassland for part of the day but head back into the timber in the evening.

Effects of climate change
Climate change/warming can keep elk in their higher elevation habitats for longer into the winter than normal. Climate changes such as warming have in some cases even increased the seasonal range of elk in the winter. For example, in Yellowstone the climate warming has kept the snow at a lower level than in the past and has given the elk the ability to populate higher ranges than before. The lack of snow in Yellowstone has also given the elk an advantage over the wolves in their predator prey relationship because wolves rely on deep snow to hunt elk in winter ranges of Yellowstone.  The total wild population is about one million individuals.

Conservation

Colorado
The Rocky Mountain elk was reintroduced in 1913 to Colorado from Wyoming after the near extinction of the regional herds. While overhunting is a significant contributing factor, the elk’s near extinction is mainly attributed to human encroachment and destruction of their natural habitats and migratory corridors. A year later, twenty-one elk from Jackson Hole, Wyoming were reintroduced to South Dakota's Wind Cave National Park for population increase. Conservation efforts also brought the elk populations in New Mexico from near-zero numbers in the late 1800s and early 1900s, to healthy populations in the 1930s in Northern New Mexico.

Nebraska
Population numbers of elk in Nebraska continued to increase through the 1970s and 1980s, to a level in which complaints from landowners in the Pine Ridge region led to the implementation of relatively liberal hunting seasons in the late 1980s. Elk numbers continued to increase through the 1990s to the present.

Washington
All Rocky Mountain elk in Washington are the result of reintroductions conducted in the early 1900s from Yellowstone elk herds. These initial reintroductions have expanded their range and have also been translocated within the State. Not all of these elk have all the habitat to be successful in large numbers; supplemental feeding programs are used to compensate for lost winter range .

Eastern U.S.
In 1990, feasibility studies were conducted to determine if wild, free-ranging elk still had a place in some of their former eastern habitats. Once this was complete, healthy source herds of Rocky Mountain elk from Arizona, Kansas, New Mexico, North Dakota, Oregon, and Utah were used to introduce this elk subspecies to the former range of the extinct eastern elk.

Kentucky
In recent years, elk from Utah have been used to reestablish a population in Kentucky.

West Virginia
In 2018, elk from Arizona were transported to West Virginia to help with reestablishing the population there. Unfortunately, a parasite has killed off some of the herd.

Canada
Their populated Canadian ranges occur in Alberta's Jasper and Banff National Parks as well as British Columbia's Kootenay and Yoho National Parks.

Chronic wasting disease
As of 2010, the Rocky Mountain elk herd was diagnosed with a serious disorder called chronic wasting disease (CWD). CWD affects the brain tissue of infected elk and is similar in symptoms to bovine spongiform encephalopathy (BSE), commonly known as mad-cow disease (MCD). There is no evidence to conclude that elk CWD is transmittable to humans, and research concerning CWD and its effect on the eco-system continues. Environmental and CWD problems in Estes Park, Colorado, and, on a greater scale, throughout the western North America have governmental policy makers searching for solutions.

References

Fish and Wildlife Habitat Management Leaflet. 1999. American Elk: Cervus elaphus. United States Department of Agriculture. Habitat Management Institute.

 Plan for Sharpshooters to Thin Colorado Elk Herd Draws Critics. By KIRK JOHNSON. Published: May 28, 2006 https://www.nytimes.com/2006/05/28/us/28elk.html
 Fibrils in brain of Rocky Mountain elk with chronic wasting disease contain scrapie amyloid. Guiroy DC, Williams ES, Song KJ, Yanagihara R, Gajdusek DC. Laboratory of Central Nervous System Studies, National Institute of Neurological Disorders and Stroke, National Institutes of Health, Bethesda, MD 20892.
 
 Neurobiology of Disease, Chronic Wasting Disease of Elk: Transmissibility to Humans Examined by Transgenic Mouse Models. Qingzhong Kong,1 Shenghai Huang,1 Wenquan Zou,1 Difernando Vanegas,1 Meiling Wang,1 Di Wu,1 Jue Yuan,1 Mengjie Zheng,1 Hua Bai,1 Huayun Deng,2 Ken Chen,3 Allen L. Jenny,4 Katherine O'Rourke,5 Ermias D. Belay,6 Lawrence B. Schonberger,6 Robert B. Petersen,1 Man-Sun Sy,1 Shu G. Chen,1 and Pierluigi Gambetti1. http://www.jneurosci.org/cgi/content/abstract/25/35/7944
 Chronic Wasting Disease Alliance
 Rocky Mountain Elk Foundation
 The Safety of Elk Meat - http://www.elk-hunting.org/elk-meat#the-safety-of-elk-meat

See also
 Tule elk
 Manitoban elk
 Roosevelt elk

Elk and red deer
Fauna of the Rocky Mountains